Valgma may refer to several places in Estonia:

Valgma, Järva County, village in Paide Parish, Järva County
Valgma, Tartu County, village in Tartu Parish, Tartu County